Wrightia pubescens is a species of small tree in the family Apocynaceae.  Its distribution includes: Australia (Northern Territory, Queensland), southern China, Taiwan (introduced), Indonesia (Java, Lesser Sunda Isl., Moluccas, Sulawesi, Sumatra), New Guinea, Philippines (Masbate, Panay, Guimaras, Negros, Cebu, Biliran, Leyte, Mindanao) and Indo-China (Cambodia, Malaysia, Thailand, Viet Nam).  In Viet Nam, it may be called: lòng mức lông.

Subspecies
The Catalogue of Life lists:
 W. pubescens laniti (Blanco) Ngan
 W. pubescens penicillata (F.M.Bailey) Ngan
 W. pubescens pubescens R. Br

References

External links 

pubescens
Flora of Indo-China
Trees of Vietnam